In 1924, problems with the previous designation system led to a general revamping of the designation system used by the United States Army Air Service. This system was to remain in effect with the U.S. Army Air Corps, the U.S. Army Air Forces and the independent U.S. Air Force, as well as those aircraft remaining in the U.S. Army after 1947. With some minor changes it became the basis of the 1962 United States Tri-Service aircraft designation system.


1924–1962 Designation System
The designation given to a particular aircraft can be broken down to provide information about that specific aircraft.
A hypothetical example shows a typical designation, and what each section is. Tables below indicate possible codes used for each section, what their meanings were, and the time period in which they were used – not all codes were in use at the same time, and some codes, such as P for pursuit were changed to F for fighter for a given aircraft while they were in service, so that the Lockheed P-80 was redesignated as the Lockheed F-80. The portion of the designation after the subtype may be omitted in normal use. The hyphen before the block number may be replaced with the word "block", and in some cases the block number may be omitted.
This information, along with the name of the service (USAAC, USAAF, USAF), the base (if permanently assigned) and the serial number was painted on the forward fuselage side under the cockpit.

Status Prefix
(generally applied only to specific aircraft)

Mission Modifier prefix
Used when an aircraft has been modified for a different role from originally designed.

Mission Letter

Model Number
In theory each new design in a specific Mission category is numbered in sequence starting at 1, so that succeeding designs are numbered 2,3,4 etc. however numbers were occasionally skipped.

Sub-type
Minor modifications to a basic design are usually given a sequentially assigned letter denoting the particular subtype, starting with A and continuing with B, C, D, etc. In general, no additional meaning can be deduced from the sub-type letter.

Block Number

Analogous to the order number, these help not just to identify when an airframe was built, but in some types distinguish changes that occurred during production not identified by the sub-type letter, as between the Republic P-47 Thunderbolt razorback variant and the bubble canopy variant. Block numbers are unique to each type of aircraft.

Production facility code
Each factory producing aircraft for the USAAF was assigned a two letter code to distinguish between the product of one facility from another. This was important because parts were not always interchangeable between different plants, and the aircraft may have required different modifications during service.

Exceptions
Aircraft ordered by foreign governments but taken over by the US Government often used the manufacturer's internal designations rather than the designation used for similar aircraft ordered by the US Government, so that the Consolidated LB-30 was a B-24 ordered by the British but not delivered, and the Vultee V.77 was similarly an AT-19.

Notes

References

Bibliography

Websites

Books

United States Army Air Forces
United States